Gaturro: The Movie (or simply Gaturro) is a 3D Argentine-Mexican-Indian CGI animated  comedy film based on the popular Argentine comic book of the same name created by Cristian Dzwonik. The film is produced by Illusion Studios, Toonz Animation, and co-produced by Mexico's Ánima Estudios. This film is the first Indian-Latin American animated co-production.

It was released in theaters on September 9, 2010 in Argentina, where it was a major commercial success, grossing a total of $8.3 million pesos (est. $0.4 million).

The film was later released in Mexico on April 27, 2012 and was a huge box-office disappointment.

The film was released direct-to-video in the United States, distributed by Viva Pictures, on 16 February 2016.

Synopsis

Gaturro is always getting into trouble and his master doesn't know what to do with him. Gaturro's heart belongs to Agatha, the most unpleasant cat of the town. His several attempts to conquer her love disappear when she stumbles across Max, a young handsome cat from an aristocratic background. Gaturro accidentally becomes famous but finds that fame and success bring other problems with them. With the help of a little mouse named Rat Pitt, they come up with a plan to prevent Agatha from marrying Max the aristocrat and coolest cat in the town.

Voice cast

Spanish cast
 Mariano Chiesa as Gaturro
 Agustina Cirulnik as Agatha
 Pablo Gandolfo as Rat Pit
 Leto Dugatkin as Max
 Valeria Gómez as Katy Kit
 Gustavo Dardés as Federico Michou
 Ándres Sala Rigler as Mimicha
 René Sagastume as Alplato
 Gustavo Bonfigli as Daniel
 Lucila Gómez as Luz
 Mara Campanelli as Agustín

English cast 
 Todd Doldersum as Gaturro / Daniel / Announcer
 Caitlin O'Reilly as Agatha / Valeria / Luz / Informetti / Gatalina Jolie
 Marty Stelnick as Max / Rat Pit / Gatulongo / Alplato / Robot
 Victoria Shepherd as Katy Kit / Mimicha / Stylist

The English-language version was found in the special features in the Argentine and Mexican DVD releases.

Cultural references
This film makes a number of references to popular Hollywood figures and movies.

Animation
The character designs and post-production services were done by Toonz India Ltd based in Trivandrum, India, while the majority of the animation was done by Illusion Studios in Argentina. The film's special effects and backgrounds were done by Ánima Estudios in Mexico. An animator who worked in 2008 on the film criticized the film for having a "bad script" with many spelling mistakes. He confirmed that there was no script for the movie then and the animators had to work out the details using only a script outline. He added however that the film was "visually correct" for kids.

Release
This film was released in 2D and 3D in Argentina on September 9, 2010. Santo Domingo Films released the film in Mexico on April 27, 2012.

Box office
It became a box office success in Argentina, opening #1 at the domestic box-office, grossing $2,268,283 pesos ($460,098 USD). It held the record as one of the biggest box-office openings in the Mexican cinema history  The film grossed a total of $10,342,696 pesos ($2,097,910 USD).

In Mexico, however, this film was a was an enormous box-office disaster, and the worst financial loss for the economy. It earned $1,725,000 on its first day, for a weekend total of $6,825,000. This is the 22nd-worst opening of all time. Adjusted for inflation, considering the total net loss of money (not the profit-to-loss ratio), it was still the fourth-largest box office recession in history. In 2014, the Los Angeles Times listed the film as one of the most expensive box-office writedowns of all time.

On 16 April 2015, Animation World Network has announced that Viva Pictures has picked up the distribution rights for a United States release. Victor Elizalde, president of Viva Pictures said, “The landscape for quality animated content is changing quickly and Imira is in leading the way by using globally recognized brands like Speed Racer and Gaturro along with visually stimulating animation."

References

External links
 

Animated films based on comics
Films based on Argentine comics
2010 3D films
2010 films
Argentine animated films
Mexican animated films
2010 computer-animated films
2010 comedy films
Ánima Estudios films
3D animated films
2010s Mexican films
2010s Argentine films